The Brewer Fieldhouse was a multi-purpose arena located in Columbia, Missouri, and home to the University of Missouri Tigers basketball team prior to the Hearnes Center opening in 1972.  Named after Chester Brewer,  the building opened in 1929 to expand on the existing 500-seat Rothwell Gymnasium.  Both buildings were converted into the Student Recreation Complex, which was renovated in 1987 and again in 2005.

References

Missouri Tigers basketball venues
Defunct college basketball venues in the United States
Defunct indoor arenas in the United States
Sports venues in Columbia, Missouri
Buildings and structures in Columbia, Missouri
Indoor arenas in Missouri
1929 establishments in Missouri
Sports venues completed in 1929